Jimmy Adrian Kaparos (born 25 December 2001) is a Dutch footballer who plays as a defensive midfielder for Eerste Divisie club PEC Zwolle.

Career
Kaparos made his professional debut for Schalke 04 in the Bundesliga on 8 May 2021, coming on as a substitute in the 73rd minute for Amine Harit against 1899 Hoffenheim. The away match finished as a 4–2 loss.

He became part of the Schalke 04 II team competing in the Regionalliga for the 2021–22 season.

On 15 July 2022, PEC Zwolle announced the signing of Kaparos on a two-year contract.

Personal life
Born in the Netherlands, Kaparos is from a Dominican mother and a Greek father, he holds a Greek passport.

References

External links
 
 
 
 

2001 births
Living people
Footballers from Arnhem
Dutch footballers
Dutch people of Dominican Republic descent
Sportspeople of Dominican Republic descent
Dutch expatriate footballers
Dutch expatriate sportspeople in Germany
Expatriate footballers in Germany
Association football midfielders
FC Schalke 04 II players
FC Schalke 04 players
PEC Zwolle players
Bundesliga players
Regionalliga players
Eredivisie players